Margaret Jane Gurney (born 1943) is an Australian artist who lives and works in Melbourne and is an advocate for Australian arts.

Born into an artistic family, Margaret represented Australia at the 2009 Florence Biennale. She has won numerous awards, was one of the first women to work as a graphic artist in Australian television and, also, was one of the first women to work in Australia as an art director in advertising.

She worked extensively as both an educator and as an administrator in Community Arts, and as a Program Manager in Arts Adult Education long before the creation of Creative Victoria in 2015.

She established her own studio in Melbourne, and has painted full time for many years.

Family
The daughter of Australian war artist, Alex Gurney (1902-1955) — the creator of the legendary Bluey and Curley cartoon — and Junee Gurney (1909-1984), née Grover, youngest daughter of the journalist Montague "Monty" MacGregor Grover (1870–1943), and Ada Grover (1877-1928), née Goldberg, Margaret Jane Gurney was born in Melbourne in 1943.

The youngest of four children, Margaret's elder siblings were John (1929–2004), Jennifer Anne (1932–2004), and Susan (1937–2003).

She married cinematographer Alan Charles Weatherley (1937-1986) on 8 April 1967. She has two children, Jane Leza Weatherley (1969-), and Mark Alan Weatherley (1972), and two grand-children, Emma and Kate Weatherley.

Education
Educated at:
 The Elsternwick State School.
 The Methodist Ladies' College, Elsternwick.  
 The Swinburne Technical College, in Hawthorn, gaining a Certificate in Art (conferred on 16 August 1962), and a Diploma of Advertising Art (conferred on 11 August 1965),
 The Phillip Institute of Technology, in Preston, gaining her Post Graduate Diploma in Community Education and Development, in 1985.

Prizes
During her time as a student she won a number of prizes for her art, including:
 At MLC: she won the Drawing Prize for original art work in 1958.
 At Swinburne: she won the Fourth Year Art School Class Prize in 1963.

Drama
A talented actress, Margaret took the part of Concha Puerto, the major protagonist in The Women Have Their Way (an English version of the Quintero brothers' :es:Puebla de las Mujeres), in MLC’s (August 1959) annual School Play.

Whilst at Swinburne, she had a number of leading roles in each of the College's first two student revues (each produced by Brian Robinson): In the Pink (1962), and Get Well Soon (1963).

Employment
After completing her formal studies at Swinburne,  she worked at two small advertising agencies: as a Graphic Artist with Curtis Stevens and Charles Billich, Melbourne, in 1964, and in Advertising Marketing with George Santos, Melbourne, from 1964 to 1966.

She was, then, employed as a graphic artist at Channel O, Melbourne from 1966 to 1967, and as television art director at George Patterson's advertising agency, in Melbourne, from 1967 to 1969.

Artist
Working as an artist from her time at Swinburne, she has "exhibited widely in solo and group exhibitions both nationally and internationally, [and has] represented Australia at the Florence Biennale in 2009 and has won numerous awards".

She is an exhibiting member of the Melbourne Society of Women Painters and Sculptors, the Victorian Artists Society, the Contemporary Art Society, and several other Melbourne art societies.

Educator
From her (1979) experience as a sessional lecturer at the Phillip Institute, Melbourne, where she lectured to Art and Design Students, she developed a strong interest in both formal and informal arts education; an interest that has remained with her ever since.

Promoter and defender of Alex Gurney's heritage
In addition to her own work as an artist, Margaret is extremely active in reviving, maintaining, and preserving the artistic legacy of her father, Alex Gurney (1902-1955).

In 2007 Margaret was the means through which the significant collection of papers and works of Alex Gurney, accession number MS 13561, were able to be acquired by the State Library of Victoria.

Works
 Gurney, M., My Dad: Alex Gurney 1902-1955, Margaret Gurney, (Black Rock), 2006.
 Roennfeldt, M.J. (ed.), Gurney, M. (illustrator), Drama in Action for Secondary Schools: Book III, (Melbourne), Thomas Nelson, 1969.

Awards
 2005: Melbourne Savage Club Invitation Art Prize for Painting.
 2007: The Kenneth Jack Memorial Drawing Award (Australian Guild of Realist Artists): the award's inaugural winner.
 2014: The Constance Wu Award (Melbourne Women Painters and Sculptors Society Artist of the Year).
 2018: Fellowship Award (Victorian Artists' Society).

Notes

References
 Man Who Pulled Girl from Sea Reopens Club, The Age, (Monday, 14 January 1957), p.5. 
 "Margaret Gurney", in Tunberg, Despina (curator) and Tunberg, Thomas (ed.), International Contemporary Masters IV, World Wide Art Books, INC, (Santa Barbara, California), 2011, pp.128-129. 
 Hollingworth, Sarah, "Spirit of Creativity", Wellplan, No.22, (Autumn 2013), pp.14-15.

External links
 Gurney Art website.

1943 births
Living people
Artists from Melbourne
Swinburne University of Technology alumni
Australian art directors
20th-century Australian women artists
Australian watercolourists
Australian art teachers
Women watercolorists
21st-century Australian women artists
21st-century Australian artists
20th-century Australian painters